Dalang (Arabic الدلنج al-Dalanj) or Dilling is a town in South Kordofan State in Sudan, north of the state capital Kadugli. As of 2008 it had a population 59,089 people. In printed sources and internet sources, including maps and atlases, the town's name is usually spelled as Dilling, reflecting the local pronunciation [ˈdɪlɪŋ]. The spellings Dalang and Dalanj reflect a pronunciation adapted to the phonotactics of Arabic.

Geography
The town has a lake in the northeastern part of the same name. An asphalted road links Dilling to Khartoum via Kosti and El Obeid, and another all-season road links Dilling to Kadugli. There is a railway station in the north of the town on a branch line to Debeibat. Dilling Airport is to the southeast of the town.

Demography
The town is inhabited mainly by Nuba (especially the Ajang such as the Dilling tribe, the Gulfan tribe, the Kodor tribe, the Dabatnah tribe, the Kortalah tribe, the Kadro tribe, the Nyimang), the Fellata, the Hawazma Arabs, the Birged tribe, and many other tribes from north and middle Sudan. The Nuba group from whom the town takes its name, the Dilling, now constitute the majority of the population.

Economy
The main economic activity is trade. Other citizens work for the government, are engaged in agriculture or cattle breeding, or work on leather or metal work crafts. Dilling is the home of Dilling University.

References

Populated places in South Kordofan